The 1937 Tour de France was the 31st edition of the Tour de France, one of cycling's Grand Tours. The Tour began in Paris with a flat stage on 30 June, and Stage 13a occurred on 15 July with a flat stage from Montpellier. The race finished in Paris on 25 July.

Stage 13a
15 July 1937 - Montpellier to Narbonne,

Stage 13b
15 July 1937 - Narbonne to Perpignan,

Rest day 4
16 July 1937 - Perpignan

Stage 14a
17 July 1937 - Perpignan to Bourg-Madame,

Stage 14b
17 July 1937 - Bourg-Madame to Ax-les-Thermes,

Stage 14c
17 July 1937 - Ax-les-Thermes to Luchon,

Rest day 5
18 July 1937 - Luchon

Stage 15
19 July 1937 - Luchon to Pau,

Rest day 6
20 July 1937 - Pau

Stage 16
21 July 1937 - Pau to Bordeaux,

Stage 17a
22 July 1937 - Bordeaux to Royan,

Stage 17b
22 July 1937 - Royan to Saintes,

Stage 17c
22 July 1937 - Saintes to La Rochelle,

Stage 18a
23 July 1937 - La Rochelle to La Roche sur Yon,  (TTT)

Stage 18b
23 July 1937 - La Roche sur Yon to Rennes,

Stage 19a
24 July 1937 - Rennes to Vire,

Stage 19b
24 July 1937 - Vire to Caen,  (ITT)

Stage 20
25 July 1937 - Caen to Paris,

References

1937 Tour de France
Tour de France stages